The 2011–12 season saw Dynamo Dresden return to the 2. Bundesliga after a five-year absence. Despite the success of the previous season, they had to largely rebuild their squad – the strike partnership of Alexander Esswein and Dani Schahin left the club in the summer, as did captain Thomas Hübener, among others. A total of 19 new players joined, notably a new strike pairing of Zlatko Dedic and Mickaël Poté who scored 25 goals between them.

After a slow start, Dynamo settled into mid-table, finishing 9th, never in contention for promotion or relegation. In the DFB-Pokal, they achieved a shock first round win over Bundesliga side Bayer Leverkusen, before being eliminated in the next round by German champions (and eventual cup winners) Borussia Dortmund. Dynamo's fans rioted at this match, and were forced to play a league game at FC Ingolstadt 04 behind closed doors as punishment.

Squad

Results

2. Bundesliga

DFB-Pokal

Transfers

External links
Season details at fussballdaten 

Dynamo Dresden seasons
Dynamo Dresden